Zhengjia Huanshi Center 
() is a 56-storey,  skyscraper in the Yuexiu District of Guangzhou, Guangdong, China. The building was completed in early 2006 following numerous construction delays, including once for a year between 2004 and 2005.

The building has 56 office floors above ground and four underground floors of vehicle garages.

See also
List of skyscrapers

References

External links

Skyscraper office buildings in Guangzhou
Buildings and structures completed in 2006
Yuexiu District